The final 2016 men's Olympic qualification tournament for rugby sevens at the 2016 Summer Olympics was held on 18 and 19 June 2016 at Stade Louis II in Fontvieille, Monaco.
The tournament used a round-robin format. 

The qualification tournament was won by Spain; as a result, they qualified for the 2016 Olympics.

Teams

Format
The teams are drawn into four pools, each containing four teams. 

The top two teams in each pool advance to the Cup stage. The team that wins the Cup qualifies for the Olympic Games.
The losers of the Cup quarter-finals play off for the Plate .
The bottom two teams in each pool go into the Bowl.
The losers of the Bowl quarter-finals play off for the Shield.

Pool stage

Pool A

Matches

Pool B

Matches

Pool C

Matches

Pool D

Matches

Knockout stage

Shield

Bowl

Plate

Cup

Overall

References 

Qual
2016 rugby sevens competitions
International sports competitions hosted by Monaco
Rugby union in Monaco
Rugby
2016 in Monégasque sport